Etlingera burttii is a monocotyledonous plant species described by Axel Dalberg Poulsen. Etlingera burttii is part of the genus Etlingera and the family Zingiberaceae. No subspecies are listed in the Catalog of Life.

Range
Its native range is in Borneo (Sabah, Sarawak).

References

burttii